Prahlad Yadav is an Indian politician and a member of Bihar Legislative Assembly of India. He represents the Suryagarha constituency in Lakhisarai district of Bihar. He was elected in 2015 as a member of Rashtriya Janata Dal. He is currently also serving as the president of Rashtriya Janata Dal in Lakhisarai.He was part of communist movement in 1980. He has been elected as MLA in 1995 for the first time. He was a founder member of Lalu Prasad Yadav's RJD. He is elected as MLA 3 times from his constituency.

References

1960 births
Living people
Rashtriya Janata Dal politicians
Bihar MLAs 2015–2020
Bihar MLAs 2020–2025